Fetakgomo Local Municipality was located in the Sekhukhune District Municipality of Limpopo province, South Africa. The seat of Fetakgomo Local Municipality was Apel. The local municipality was one of the four to have passed the 2009-10 audit by the Auditor-General of South Africa, who deemed it to have a clean administration. In 2016 it was merged with Greater Tubatse Local Municipality to form the Fetakgomo Tubatse Local Municipality.

Main places
The 2001 census divided the municipality into the following main places:

Politics 
The municipal council consists of twenty-five members elected by mixed-member proportional representation. Thirteen councillors are elected by first-past-the-post voting in thirteen wards, while the remaining twelve are chosen from party lists so that the total number of party representatives is proportional to the number of votes received. In the election of 18 May 2011, the African National Congress (ANC) won a majority of twenty-one seats on the council.
The following table shows the results of the election.

References

External links 
 Official homepage

Local municipalities of the Sekhukhune District Municipality